Hellenic Train S.A., formerly TrainOSE S.A., is a private railway company in Greece which currently operates passenger and freight trains on OSE lines. TrainOSE was acquired in September 2017 by the Italian national railway company, Ferrovie dello Stato Italiane. The company was a subsidiary of the Hellenic Railways Organisation (OSE) until 2008, when it became an independent state-owned company until its privatisation in 2017. Hellenic Train employs train crews, operators and manages the most of rail services throughout the Greek railway network, leasing rolling stock owned by GAIOSE except for ETR 470 trains. In 2022 the company rebranded as Hellenic Train.

History
The company was a subsidiary of the Hellenic Railways Organisation (OSE) and had been since 2005. Before 2005 it had been an in-house service of OSE. In 2008 the company became an independent state-owned company. In 2017 it became a wholly-owned subsidiary of the FS Italiane Group.

Privatisation
The Hellenic Republic Asset Development Fund became the sole shareholder of the corporation in April 2013. An international tendering process for the privatisation of TrainOSE began in July 2013.  The Italian state railway group Ferrovie dello Stato Italiane submitted the only binding offer for a 100% stake in TrainOSE, announced on 6 July 2016. On 14 July 2016, the privatisation agency accepted Ferrovie dello Stato Italiane's offer, worth 45 million euros, to buy 100% of TrainOSE. TrainOSE's shares were completely transferred on 14 September 2017, and is currently a wholly owned subsidiary of Ferrovie dello Stato Italiane. In 2022, TrainOSE was rebranded as Hellenic Train. 

On 28 February 2023, Greece suffered its worst rail disaster when 57 people died in the Tempi train crash, in which a Hellenic Train from Athens collided with a freight train coming from Thessaloniki. Many of the people on the passenger train were students returning from Carnival, while the freight train likely contained heavy steel plates and other construction material; the two trains collided at a combined speed of 100 miles per hour. The station master reportedly failed to switch the rail line and advised the train driver to ignore a red signal, causing both trains to be switched to the same track. Following the train crash, services were suspended and it was announced that buses would replace train services until safety improved and the new signalling system is completed. A limited service will begin in April 2023 and the new signalling system is expected by September 2023.

Domestic services

Mainline passenger services

TrainOSE operates three types of regional rail passenger services which include "Regular" trains (regular/common train), Express trains and Intercity (IC) trains.

The regular rail service is the slowest, with trains making frequent stops, while it is also the cheapest available. Express trains are faster trains, making fewer stops in sections served by regular trains. Intercity (IC) trains are the fastest but the most expensive. The needed supplement on Intercity (IC) trains typically doubled or tripled the base fare respectively, but today this is determined more by the different competing forms of transport, mainly air transport. Car transport is also available on night services on the main line from Athens to Thessaloniki.

Passenger accommodation is similar in all classes of long-distance trains. Seat reservation, bar, and restaurant facilities are available on long-distance express and on Intercity (IC) trains.

The numbering of the trains is determined by the type of train. Regular trains (and also Proastiakos suburban/commuter rail service trains) have four-digit train numbers, Express trains have three-digit train numbers, and Intercity (IC) and Intercity trains have two-digit train numbers, preceded by the symbols IC.

The following table shows the situation as of November 2020. Numbers indicate trains in each direction on weekdays (Monday-Friday), excluding public holidays.

Suburban/Commuter rail services between Piraeus – Athens (Athens Central Station, also known as Larissa Station) – Athens International Airport and Kiato are not listed. In addition to the above regional rail services on the OSE network, TrainOSE also operates two suburban/commuter rail services on the remnants of the former Peloponesse metre gauge network:
 Katakolo to Ancient Olympia via Pyrgos
 Patras – Rio

A limited seasonal/tourist service of one train per day also operates as part of the Pelion railway.

Proastiakos commuter rail service

Proastiakos (meaning "suburban") is the name used for the suburban (commuter rail) services of TrainOSE in the Athens and Thessaloniki and Patras areas. Proastiakos was initially an independent subsidiary within the OSE group but has since been merged with TrainOSE S.A. The network infrastructure, even if partly purpose-built for the Proastiakos service, is part of the national railway network of OSE and, as such, is used by the regional rail services, even freight.

Proastiakos is a relatively new development, with the first service inaugurated for the 2004 Athens Olympic Games, between Athens International Airport and Athens (via Neratziotissa station, close to the Olympic Stadium). The commuter rail services that are currently operated by Proastiakos include the lines on the 'main corridor' of Piraeus–Athens–Ano Liosia, Ano Liosia–Athens International Airport, Ano Liosia–Corinth–Kiato; and between the cities of Thessaloniki and Larissa.

The rolling stock of the Proastiakos commuter rail services include Class 460 Siemens Desiro five-car electric multiple units (EMU), used on the electrified sections of the Ano Liosia–Athens International Airport, Ano Liosia–Corinth–Kiato and Thessaloniki–Larissa lines; while Stadler GTW 2/6 DMUs and MAN-2000 DMUs are used on the non-electrified section between Piraeus–Athens–Ano Liosia.

In Athens, Proastiakos provides connections with Athens metro (Line 1) at Neratziotissa station, Athens Metro line 2 at Athens Central (Larissa station) and Athens Metro line 3 at Plakentias station; while it is also the only passenger rail service from Athens to Peloponnese, providing connections with the Peloponnese metre gauge network at Corinth and Kiato stations. These regional rail links have expanded the Proastiakos role from being just a pure suburban-commuter rail service.

Freight rail
As of February 2011 the current regular freight services of TrainOSE consist of:
 A night service from Agios Ioannis Rentis in Athens to the Thessaloniki marshalling yard
 A night service from Thessaloniki yard to Agios Ioannis Rentis
 A night service from Agios Ioannis Rentis to Agioi Anargyroi container unloading facility and back

Other irregular national and international freight services also exist.

International services

On 13 February 2011, due to the Greek financial crisis and subsequent budget cuts by the Greek government, all international services were suspended. The Greek railway system used to connect with the railways of neighbouring countries Bulgaria at Promahonas (Koulata) and at Ormenio, with Turkey at Pythio and with the railways of North Macedonia at Idomeni.

The passenger services from Greece that ran to neighbouring countries until February 2011 were:

 Thessaloniki – Skopje – Belgrade
 Thessaloniki – Sofia – Bucharest
 Thessaloniki – Istanbul (Friendship Express)
 Athens – Sofia

However, in May 2014 some international services were re-introduced on the following lines:

 Thessaloniki – Skopje – Belgrade
 Thessaloniki – Sofia – Bucharest
 Thessaloniki – Sofia* Arrival train into Thessaloniki connecting with the 11 pm service to Athens, thus being aimed at connecting passengers from Sofia to Athens.

Rolling stock
The Hellenic Train rolling stock, which until the end of 2017 was owned by OSE, was valued and then transferred almost in its entirety (except for some museum vehicles) by OSE: to the Greek State in exchange for an equal reduction of OSE's debt to the Greek State. GAIAOSE was appointed administrator of the rolling stock of the Greek State, which leases it to TRAINOSE for a price. In addition, TRAINOSE leases rolling stock to Rail Cargo Logistics (a member of Goldair), under a special contract. However, the arrival of rolling stock in Greece for use by TRAINOSE's parent company Trenitalia has been reported to take place in the context of the company's investments. 5 Pendolino trains are expected to arrive in Greece in late 2020 after a delay due to the global pandemic.

In 2022, "Frecciargento ETR 470" will come into service as the first Italian, and also Hybrid locomotive (combine both oil and electric) are planned.

Back in 2019, It was decided that these units would be used on the Athens – Thessaloniki line. Units will be converted for use in Greece, the existing 3 kV DC equipment is to be replaced with 25 kV 50 Hz equipment and they will be fitted with ETCS onboard equipment. In August 2018, a similar ETR.485 unit transferred to Greece for testing purposes, in anticipation of the ETR 470 fleet's arrival, but because it was not designed for the Greek network, it was decided instead to launch the ETR 470, which were originally expected to come in 2019, with the completion of the electrification and testing of the ETCS. However, in February 2020, with the TRAINOSE depot not yet ready to receive them delivery was delayed. Instead of arriving in the summer of 2020, delivery was postponed until the end of 2020 or the beginning of 2021. The delivery was delayed even further, so the first unit is scheduled to arrive on 18 January 2021 in Thessaloniki, via a route from Piacenza. The remaining units were to gradually arrive and the first route was scheduled to take place on 25 March 2021, according to the statements of TRAINOSE's managing director, Filippos Tsalidis.

See also
 Budapest–Belgrade–Skopje–Athens railway
 Hellenic Railways Organisation
 Proastiakos
 Rail transport in Greece
 Tempi train crash

References

External links

 

Railway companies of Greece
Privatization in Greece
Railway companies established in 2008
Ferrovie dello Stato Italiane
Greek brands
Former government-owned companies of Greece